Paul Lange (6 February 1931 – 15 March 2016) was a West German-German sprint canoeist who competed in the late 1950s and early 1960s. He won a gold medal in the K-1 4 × 500 m event at the 1960 Summer Olympics in Rome (with Dieter Krause, Günther Perleberg and Friedhelm Wentzke). Lange also won two medals at the 1958 ICF Canoe Sprint World Championships in Prague with a gold in the K-1 4 × 500 m and a bronze in the K-2 500 m events. He was born in Oberhausen.

References

Paul Lange's obituary 

1931 births
2016 deaths
Canoeists at the 1960 Summer Olympics
German male canoeists
Olympic canoeists of the United Team of Germany
Olympic gold medalists for the United Team of Germany
Olympic medalists in canoeing
Sterkrade
ICF Canoe Sprint World Championships medalists in kayak
Medalists at the 1960 Summer Olympics
Sportspeople from Oberhausen